Janeževo Brdo is a small village in the hills east of Prem in the Municipality of Ilirska Bistrica in the Inner Carniola region of Slovenia.

The local church in the settlement is dedicated to Saint Francis of Assisi and belongs to the Parish of Prem.

References

External links 
Janeževo Brdo on Geopedia

Populated places in the Municipality of Ilirska Bistrica